Hanna Serhiivna Rizatdinova (born 16 July 1993) is a Ukrainian individual rhythmic gymnast. In the all-around event, she is the 2016 Olympic bronze medalist, a two-time World All-around medalist (silver in 2013, bronze in 2014), and a two-time (2014, 2016) European All-around bronze medalist.

Career
Rizatdinova started to train gymnastics in Simferopol and was coached by her mother Oksana Rizatdinova. She won the silver all-around medal at the 2008 Kyiv Junior World Cup behind Russian gymnast Daria Dmitrieva. She was part of the Ukraine team that won bronze at the 2008 European Junior Championships in Torino.

As a senior, Rizatdinova won bronze with Team Ukraine at the 2011 World Championships and 2011 European Championships.

Rizatdinova had a successful World Cup series at the 2012 Deriugina Cup in Kyiv. She won the bronze in the all-around and in the hoop final, and silver for the ball and clubs final. She then competed at the 2012 European Championships and finished 8th in the all-around.

Rizatdinova represented Ukraine in the individual all-around event at the 2012 Summer Olympics, where she placed 10th in the finals.

2013
Rizatdinova returned to competition in the 2013 Season under the new Code of Points system. She won the 2013 LA Lights and won the gold in all-around at the first World Cup series held in Tartu, Estonia. At the second World Cup in Lisbon, Portugal, Rizatdinova won the bronze medal in All-around behind Russians Margarita Mamun and Alexandra Merkulova. She won another pair of silver medal in clubs, a ball final and a bronze medal in the hoop final. Rizatdinova competed at the 2013 Pesaro World Cup where she won a bronze medal in ribbon and clubs. She finished 5th in all-around at the 2013 Sofia World Cup, she shared the bronze medal in clubs with Son Yeon-Jae and won silver in clubs and ribbon (tied with  Margarita Mamun). Hanna won her second World Cup All-around gold in  2013 Corbeil-Essonnes beating gymnasts Melitina Staniouta of Belarus and Margarita Mamun of Russia. She won gold in clubs, silver in hoop and ribbon, bronze in ball final. Rizatdinova then competed at the 2013 European Championships in Vienna, Austria and (together with her teammates Alina Maksymenko and Viktoria Mazur) won the Team silver medal. She won silver in the ribbon final. At the 2013 Summer Universiade in Kazan, she won the bronze medal in all-around. In the event finals, she shared the silver medal with teammate Alina Maksymenko and won bronze in ball and clubs (also tied with Alina Maksymenko). Rizatdinova together with Maksymenko and Mazur appeared in an editorial on the 2013 August edition of Ukraine Vogue. Rizatdinova competed at the 2013 World Games in Cali where she won gold in hoop and silver medals in ball, clubs. She then competed at the 2013 World Championships in Kyiv, Ukraine where she qualified to 4 event finals. She won gold in hoop beating newly turned Russian senior Yana Kudryavtseva and her teammate Margarita Mamun, it was Ukraine's first gold medal since Anna Bessonova became the World Champion in 2007, Rizatdinova also won silver in ribbon, placed 6th in ball and 4th in clubs final. Rizatdinova won the All-around silver at the 2013 World Championships with an overall score of 73.041 ahead of Belarusian Melitina Staniouta. She was awarded the Longines Prize for Elegance in rhythmic gymnastics event. On October 25–27, Rizatdinova competed at the World Club Championship, the 2013 Aeon Cup in Tokyo, Japan representing team Deriugina school (together with teammates Viktoria Mazur and junior Eleonora Romanova) won the team silver. She finished 4th in the All-around finals behind Melitina Staniouta of Belarus.

2014
In 2014 Season, Rizatdinova began competing at the 2014 LA Lights and won the all-around silver medal behind Melitina Staniouta. She finished 5th in all-around at the 2014 Thiais Grand Prix, won silver in ball, bronze in clubs, hoop and gold in ribbon (tied with Melitina Staniouta of Belarus). Rizatdinova won the All-around silver medal behind Russian debutante Aleksandra Soldatova at the 2014 Debrecen World Cup after missing a ball routine element and dropping the apparatus. Qualifying to all 4 event finals, she won the gold medal in ball, silver in clubs, placed 4th in ribbon and 6th in hoop. She finished 5th in All-around at the 2014 Stuttgart World Cup, qualifying to 4 event finals: she won bronze in ball (tied with Mamun), placed 4th in hoop, 7th in clubs and 8th in ribbon. Rizatdinova's next event was at the 2014 Pesaro World Cup where she won the all-bronze behind Kudryavtseva and Mamun, in the event finals: she won bronze in hoop and ribbon. On May 9–11, Rizatdinova won the all-around bronze at the 2014 Corbeil-Essonnes World Cup, she qualified to 4 event finals and won gold in hoop, ball and bronze in ribbon. On June 10–15, Rizatdinova competed at the 2014 European Championships and won the all-around bronze medal. On September 22–28, Rizatdinova (along with teammates Viktoria Mazur and Eleonora Romanova) represented Ukraine at the 2014 World Championships where they took the Team bronze with a total of 135.515 points. She qualified to all event finals and won 2 bronze medals (clubs, ribbon) and placed 4th (in hoop, clubs). In the All-around, Rizatdinova won the all-around bronze medal with a total of 72.449 points putting her ahead of Korean Son Yeon-Jae. On October 17–19, Rizatdinova traveled in Tokyo for the 2014 Aeon Cup, representing team Deriugina school club (together with teammates Eleonora Romanova and junior Mariia Mulyk) won the team bronze. She finished 4th in the All-around finals behind Melitina Staniouta of Belarus.

2015
In 2015 Season, Rizatdinova's first competition was at the 2015 L.A. Lights where she won the all-around gold ahead of Belarusians Melitina Staniouta and Katsiaryna Halkina. She then swept the gold medals at the 2015 Valentine Cup in the all-around and all event finals. On March 13–15, Rizatdinova then took the silver medal at the Trophy de Barcelona in the all-around. On March 21–22, Rizatdinova won the all-around gold at the 2015 Thiais Grand Prix, in event finals, she took gold in hoop, ribbon, clubs (tied with Marina Durunda) and silver in ball. On April 10–12, Rizatdinova placed 4th in all-around at the 2015 Pesaro World Cup, she qualified to 4 event finals taking silver in ribbon, bronze in clubs and finishing 4th in hoop, ball. Rizatdinova with teammates (Viktoria Mazur, Eleonora Romanova) competed at the 2015 European Championships where Team Ukraine won bronze, Rizatdinova qualified to all 4 event finals: silver in clubs, 5th in hoop, 4th in ball, and 7th in ribbon. Rizatdinova competed at the 2015 Holon Grand Prix finishing 4th in all-around behind Russian Aleksandra Soldatova. She qualified to all apparatus finals: winning gold in ribbon, silver in clubs, placed 4th in hoop, and 7th in ball. On June 15–21, Rizatdinova competed at the inaugural 2015 European Games where she finished 4th in the all-around behind Belarusian Melitina Staniouta, she qualified to all 4 apparatus finals: taking silver medals (in ball, clubs), she finished 6th in hoop and 5th in ribbon. Her next competition was at the 2015 Summer Universiade in Gwangju, Korea were Rizatdinova won the all-around silver medal behind Korean Son Yeon-Jae. She qualified to all event apparatus winning gold in clubs, silver in ball, bronze in ribbon and 4th in hoop. In August, Rizatdinova competed at the 2015 Budapest World Cup finishing 5th in all-around behind Aleksandra Soldatova, Rizatdinova qualified to 4 apparatus finals finishing 4th in hoop, ball, a silver in clubs and in her last event, she won gold in ribbon ahead of Russian Margarita Mamun. In her next competition at the 2015 Sofia World Cup, Rizatdinova won the all-around bronze medal ahead of Melitina Staniouta. She qualified to all apparatus finals taking bronze in hoop, ball, clubs and ribbon. On September 9–13, Rizatdinova (together with teammates Viktoria Mazur, and Eleonora Romanova) competed at the 2015 World Championships in Stuttgart, with Team Ukraine winning the bronze medal. Rizatdinova also qualified to all apparatus finals taking bronze medals in hoop, clubs, ribbon and finished 4th in ball. In the all-around finals; Rizatdinova dropped her clubs out of the carpet in her last throw ending her hopes for a medal finish, she eventually finished 5th behind Georgia's Salome Pazhava. On October 2–4, Rizatdinova together with teammates Viktoria Mazur and junior Olena Diachenko represented Team Deriugins School at the 2015 Aeon Cup in Tokyo Japan, Rizatdinova won silver in the individual all-around finals with a total of 73.616 and with team Ukraine taking silver in the overall standings.

2016

In 2016, Rizatdinova started her season with an all-around gold medal win at the 2016 L.A. Lights. In February, Rizatdinova followed it with another gold medal win in all-around at the 2016 Valentine Cup in Tartu, Estonia. On February 26–28, Rizatdinova competed at the 2016 Espoo World Cup and took bronze in the all-around; in apparatus finals, she won gold in ribbon, hoop, silver in clubs and bronze in ball. On March 17–20, Rizatdinova then competed at the 2016 Lisboa World Cup where she won the all-around silver with a total of 73.700 points. In apparatus finals, she won gold in clubs, ribbon, silver in hoop, 9th in ball due to the ball going outside the lines, picking up a new ball, and not completing a mastery. At the 30th Thiais Grand Prix event in Paris, Rizatdinova finished 4th in the all-around behind Melitina Staniouta, she qualified 3 apparatus finals taking silver in clubs, bronze in ribbon and placed 6th in ball. On April 1–3, Rizatdinova competed at the 2016 Pesaro World Cup where she won the all-around bronze with a total of 74.550 points. In event finals: she won gold in ball, ribbon, silver in hoop and 9th after a drop in her mastery and in her dance steps in clubs. On May 6–8, Rizatdinova won the all-around gold at the Corbeil-Essonnes International Tournament with a total of 74.165 points; she also won gold in all 4 apparatus finals. Rizatdinova then won silver in the all-around at the 2016 Sofia World Cup, and in the apparatus finals she won gold in hoop, silver in ball, clubs and 4th in ribbon. On June 3–5, Rizatdinova then won silver in the all-around at the 2016 Guadalajara World Cup with a new PB score of 75.150 points, she won silver in ball, bronze in hoop, clubs and placed 5th in ribbon. On June 17–19, Rizatdinova competed at the 2016 European Championships where she won the All-around bronze medal scoring a total of 75.299 points behind Margarita Mamun. On July 1–3, Rizatdinova competed at the 2016 Berlin World Cup where she finished 5th in the all-around after dropping her ball in a risk element; a roll out of carpet and mistakes in her clubs routine, she qualified to 3 apparatus taking gold in clubs, hoop(tied with Melitina Staniouta) and silver in ribbon. Rizatdinova competed at the 2016 Rio Olympics, on August 20 at the rhythmic gymnastics individual all-around final, she won the bronze medal with a total of 73.583, edging out Korean Son Yeon-Jae. On September 9–11, Rizatdinova together with teammates Viktoria Mazur and junior Olena Diachenko represented team Deriugina school at the annual 2016 Aeon Cup in Tokyo, where they won the team bronze and with Rizatdinova finishing 2nd in the all-around.

2017
In 2017, the post-Olympic season with a new code of points, Rizatdinova was scheduled to compete at the  Kyiv Grand Prix. However, she withdrew from the competition after her hoop routine. Later that year, she was invited as an honorary guest to the 2017 World Championships in Pesaro, Italy, and it was discovered that she was 7 months pregnant. A couple of weeks later, she confirmed her pregnancy via Instagram.

Early and personal life
Rizatdinova was born in Simferopol, Crimea. Since 2011 Rizatdinova lives in Kyiv. Her mother heads a Simferopol rhythmic gymnastics school. Both her parents grew up in Russia before they moved to Crimea. Her father is of Kazan Tatar descent. 

During late 2013 and early 2014 Euromaidan-protest in Kyiv, Rizatdinova and her teammates changed training halls several times "because the coaches did not know where it would be safer" and their main training centre October Palace became occupied by protesters. Rizatdinova admitted that during Euromaidan, "we were very terrified".

Roughly three months after the March 2014 annexation of Crimea by Russia , on 24 June 2014, Rizatdinova stated that she was "outraged" and found the annexation to be "unpleasant and terrifying", because she did not believe that Crimea was part of Russia. She also vowed never to compete for Russia.

Rizatdinova is the ex-wife of Oleksandr Onyshchenko. In 2017 their son Roman was born.

Routine music information

Detailed Olympic results

Notes

References

External links
 
 
 
 
 

1993 births
Living people
Ukrainian rhythmic gymnasts
Deriugins Gymnasts
Olympic gymnasts of Ukraine
Gymnasts at the 2012 Summer Olympics
Gymnasts at the 2016 Summer Olympics
Sportspeople from Simferopol
Ukrainian people of Tatar descent
Ukrainian people of Russian descent
Gymnasts at the 2015 European Games
European Games medalists in gymnastics
European Games silver medalists for Ukraine
Medalists at the Rhythmic Gymnastics World Championships
Medalists at the Rhythmic Gymnastics European Championships
World Games gold medalists
World Games silver medalists
Competitors at the 2013 World Games
Universiade medalists in gymnastics
Universiade gold medalists for Ukraine
Universiade silver medalists for Ukraine
Universiade bronze medalists for Ukraine
Olympic bronze medalists for Ukraine
Medalists at the 2013 Summer Universiade
Medalists at the 2015 Summer Universiade